Sakis Tanimanidis (born 30 April 1981) is a Greek TV host, producer and entrepreneur. Tanimanidis became known in his native country as the host, creator, producer and director of the travel show World Party that aired on Alpha TV from 2014 to 2016. In 2017, he became a household name as the Greek host and co-producer of Survivor 2017(the adaptation of the international franchise for the Turkish and Greek television). He is also a serial entrepreneur. He is the co-founder of Enthoosia that owns Museums in 7 countries around the world. He has invested/founded multiple start-ups in Greece and abroad.

Early life 
Tanimanidis was born in Thessaloniki, Greece on 30 April 1981. He showed an early interest in showbusiness: While still an engineer student in the state university of Thessaloniki, Tanimanidis co-hosted the TV show Asteria kai Labara on TV 100 before moving to Boston for a 2-year MBA in Babson College.

Career

World Party (2013–2016) 
Upon his return from the US in Greece, Tanimanidis created his own TV production company and the concept of the travel show World Party. In this show he and his friends visited more than 40 countries around the world and engaged in risky experiences and unique challenges. World Party mission was to explore our boundless and beautiful world through its tremendous people and places. Tanimanidis was the host, creator, producer and director of the show.

Survivor (2017–2019) 

In 2017 Tanimanidis was chosen by Acun Medya as the host of Survivor. The show is filmed in the Dominican Republic for both Turkish and Greek audiences with Tanimanidis being the host of the Greek cast version. TV ratings have been record-breaking for a prime-time reality programme.

Greece Got Talent (2017–2018) 
In 2017 he was selected to be one of the judges in season 5 of this show alongside Giorgos Kapoutzidis and Maria Bakodimou.

Sakis Tanimanidis maintains his own travel agency. Also, he has founded Baby Blue Project, a production company for TV shows, concept creation, commercial videos, content development and more. Baby Blue Project is equipped with modern tools and great dreams and based in Athens.

Boom! (2019-2020) 
In 2019, he was selected to present a new game show called Boom! on Skai TV. The game show was stopped abruptly due to low ratings in December of the same year. Some episodes aired on repeat in the summer of 2020.

Dragons’ Den (2023-present) 
The Greek version of Dragons' Den began airing in January 2023 on ANT1. It is hosted by Sakis Tanimanidis.

Personal life 
Tanimanidis announced in 2017 that he is in a relationship with Christina Bompa. The couple married Saturday 1 September 2018 in the Greek Island of Sifnos. In December 2020, they announced that they are expecting twins.

References

Living people
1981 births
Businesspeople from Thessaloniki
Greek television personalities
Mass media people from Thessaloniki